"Don't Break the Heart" is a song by English singer-songwriter Tom Grennan. It was released on 3 September 2021 as the third single from the special edition of his second studio album Evering Road. The song was written by Grennan, Ben Kohn, Chris Loco, Pete Kelleher, Tom Barnes and Tom Mann, and produced by TMS.

Background
On the inspiration behind the song, Grennan stated:

Content
Liv Rose of Gig Goer described "Don't Break the Heart" as "a euphoric track inspired by personal loss and grief. As gentle, acoustic guitars build to powerful percussion", featuring as "tackles complex human emotions in a remarkably uplifting way". The song is written in the key of C♯ minor, with a tempo of 123 beats per minute.

Music video
An accompanying video was released on 29 September 2021, And it Was Released On 4 December 2021 On Radio.

Credits and personnel
Credits adapted from Tidal.

 TMS – producer
 Ben Kohn – composer, lyricist, programmer, synthesizer
 Chris Loco – composer, lyricist
 Pete Kelleher – composer, lyricist, keyboards
 Tom Barnes – composer, lyricist, drums
 Tom Grennan – composer, lyricist, associated performer, background vocal, drums
 Tom Mann – composer, lyricist
 Dan Bartlett – bass, drums, guitar, synthesizer
 Ollie Green – engineer, piano, recording engineer
 Vern Asbury – guitar
 Chris Gehringer – mastering engineer
 Dan D'Lion – misc producer
 Dan Grech – mixing engineer

Charts

Weekly charts

Year-end charts

Certifications

References

2021 songs
2021 singles
Tom Grennan songs
Songs written by Tom Grennan